46,XX/46,XY is a chimeric genetic condition characterized by the presence of some cells that express a 46,XX karyotype and some cells that express a 46,XY karyotype in a single human being. The cause of the condition lies in utero with the aggregation of two distinct blastocysts or zygotes (one of which expresses 46,XX and the other of which expresses 46,XY) into a single embryo, which subsequently leads to the development of a single individual with two distinct cell lines, instead of a pair of fraternal twins. 46,XX/46,XY chimeras are the result of the merging of two non-identical twins. This is not to be confused with mosaicism or hybridism, neither of which are chimeric conditions. Since individuals with the condition have two cell lines of the opposite sex, it can also be considered an intersex condition.

In humans, sexual dimorphism is a consequence of the XY sex-determination system. In normal prenatal sex differentiation, the male and female embryo is anatomically identical until week 7 of the pregnancy, when the presence or the absence of the SRY gene on the Y chromosome causes the undetermined gonadal tissue to undergo differentiation and eventually become a pair of testes or ovaries respectively. The cells of the developing testes produce anti-müllerian hormone (AMH) and androgens, causing the reproductive tract and the genitals of the fetus to differentiate. As individuals with 46,XX/46,XY partially express the SRY gene, the normal process by which an embryo normally develops into a phenotypic male or phenotypic female may be significantly affected causing variation in the gonads, the reproductive tract and the genitals. Despite this, there have been cases of completely normal sex differentiation occurring in 46,XX/46,XY individuals reported in the medical literature. 46,XX/46,XY chimerism can be identified during pregnancy by prenatal screening or in early childhood through genetic testing and direct observation.

The rate of incidence is difficult to determine as the majority of diagnoses go unreported in the literature.

Signs and symptoms

Physical 
46,XX/46,XY is associated with a wide spectrum of different physical presentations, ranging from what was formerly known as "true hermaphroditism"  to a completely normal male or female phenotype. Due to this variation, genetic testing is the only way to reliably make a diagnosis.

46,XX/46,XY is possible if there is direct observation of one or more of the following:
 Small phallus midway in size between a clitoris and a penis
 Incompletely closed urogenital opening (shallow vagina)
 Abnormal urethra opening on the perineum
Though some individuals with 46,XX/46,XY have ovarian tissue and testicular tissue simultaneously, there have been no reported cases of both gonads being functional in the same person, with the portion of fertile cases mostly favoring functionality of the ovarian tissue.

At puberty, a mix of male and female characteristics may emerge. Some individuals will experience deepening of the voice and secondary hair development, while others may experience breast tissue development.

Segmentation of skin (distinct patches of skin) has also been observed. However, this trait is not unique to 46,XX/46,XY chimerism. It has also been observed in other types of chimerism.

Cognitive 
Individuals with the condition do not experience cognitive impairment.

Genetic mechanism 
46,XX/46,XY is an example of tetragametic chimerism because it requires four gametes – two sperm and two ova.
 46,XX/46,XY is most commonly explained by the in utero combination of two fertilized zygotes. Two ova from the mother are fertilized by two sperm from the father. One sperm contains an X chromosome; the other contains a Y chromosome. The result is that a zygote with an XY genotype and a zygote with an XX genotype are produced. Under normal circumstances, the two resulting zygotes would have gone on to become fraternal twins. However, in 46,XX/46,XY, the two zygotes fuse shortly following fertilization to become a two-cell zygote made up of two different nuclei. The zygotes fuse early enough that there is no risk of them developing into conjoined twins. Variations of this mechanism include fertilization of an ovum and its first or second polar body by two sperm.
 46,XX/46,XY can also be explained by a mosaic-based mechanism. A single zygote is formed from the fertilization of a normal X ovum by an aneuploid XY sperm. The resulting XXY zygote divides to give three cell lines: 46,XX/46,XY/47,XXY. The aneuploid 47,XXY cell line is eliminated during early embryogenesis. The 46,XX/46,XY cell lines remain and go on to become a chimeric individual.
 46,XX/46,XY can also arise when a haploid ovum undergoes a round of mitosis, and the subsequent daughter cells are fertilized by an X and a Y sperm, respectively.

Diagnosis 
Diagnosing a chimera is particularly difficult due to the random distribution of 46,XX and 46,XY cells within the body. An organ might be made up of a mix of 46,XX and 46,XY, but it may also be made up entirely of one genotype only. When that is the case, no abnormalities are noted and other types of tissues need to be analyzed.

Pre-birth testing 
 Ultrasound - looking for ambiguous genitalia
 Amniocentesis - looking for a karyotype of 46,XX/46,XY
 Cord blood sampling - looking for a karyotype of 46,XX/46,XY

Post-birth testing 
 Blood testing - looking for red blood cells of different blood types
 Tissue sampling - looking for more than one set of DNA within the sample

References

External links 

Chromosomal abnormalities
Intersex variations
Chimerism